The 2003 Toyota Atlantic Championship season was contested over 12 rounds. In this one-make formula all drivers had to utilize Swift chassis and Toyota engines. 14 different teams and 24 different drivers competed. All drivers were able to score points.  The Toyota Atlantic Championship Presented by Yokohama Drivers' Champion was A. J. Allmendinger driving for RuSPORT.

Calendar

bold indicate pole position

Final points standings

Driver

For every race the points were awarded: 20 points to the winner, 16 for runner-up, 14 for third place, 12 for fourth place, 10 for fifth place, 8 for sixth place, 6 seventh place, winding down to 1 point for 15th place. Lower placed drivers did not award points. Additional points were awarded to the fastest qualifier on Friday (1 point), the fastest qualifier on Saturday (1 point) and to the driver leading the most laps (1 point). Oval races only saw one qualifying.

Note:

Race 3 no additional point for the qualifying were awarded due to rain, starting lineup based on combined practice times.

Race 3, 4, 6, 7 and 11 not all points were awarded (not enough competitors).

Complete Overview

R17=retired, but classified NS=did not start

See also
 2003 CART season
 2003 Indianapolis 500
 2003 IndyCar Series season
 2003 Infiniti Pro Series season

External links
ChampCarStats.com

Atlantic Championship
Atlantic Championship
Atlantic Championship seasons
Atlantic